Hanna van Vollenhoven Vories (1889 – 1972) was a Dutch composer and pianist who later moved to America. She is best remembered today for composing and performing music for player piano rolls. Her music was published under the name "Hanna Vollenhoven."

Early life and education 
Hanna van Vollenhoven Wolff was born in The Hague. Her father and grandfather were musicians, as was her brother Phillip. She studied music at the Amsterdam Conservatory with Julius Roentgen, Louis Coenan, Hugo Riemann, Bernard Zweers, and later with Alfred Cortot, and Leopold Godowsky.

Career 
Vollenhoven's European debut as a pianist was in 1909. In 1915, she visited America and made her American debut with the Chicago Symphony.  Soon after, she withdrew from her position on the Netherlands Committee for Arts, Science, and Friendly Relations to pursue music full time in America.

Vollenhoven initially lived in Tarrytown, New York, while working in New York City. She played piano in Winthrop Ames' production of Pierrot the Prodigal and gave solo recitals, advertising performances of "modern and ulta-modern composers such as Chabrier, Debussy, Roger, Scriabine and Lambord" for her 1917–1918 season. 
 
Vollenhoven composed and played at least two piano pieces for the De Luxe Reproducing Roll Corporation: The Thought of You and Viennese Waltz. She also played her composition Mon Reve, and possibly other pieces, for Welte Mignon piano rolls. In 1927, Vollenhoven and Vaughn De Leath (the "Radio Girl") recorded Vollenhoven's composition The Night Before Christmas for Edison Records (#52131). She also wrote "A Visit with Richard Pitrot", for the Musical Monitor in 1921, and a tribute to Leopold Godowsky for a New Jersey newspaper in 1938.

Her music was published by the Boston Music Company, Casa Ricordi, G. Schirmer Inc., and Winthrop Rogers Ltd (now Boosey & Hawkes).

Compositions 
Compositions by Hanna van Vollenhoven included an operetta, a cantata, and works for piano and voice.

Operetta 

Alice in Movieland

Piano 

 Mon Reve (My Dream)
 Old Netherland Folksongs 
 Thought of You
 Viennese Waltz

Vocal 

 "Hear Me Speedily, O Lord"!
 "America We Sing to Thee" (1945)
 Hymn (for youth choir)
 "Joyous Meditation" (text by Gibbs Hofmann; music by Vollenhoven)
 "Love Me, I Love You" (text by Christina Rossetti; music by Vollenhoven)
 "(The) Night Before Christmas" (text by Clement Clarke Moore; piano accompaniment by Vollenhoven; sheet music illustrated by Grace Drayton)
 "Songs" (text by George Edward Woodberry; music by Vollenhoven)
 Star of the Renaissance: A Vision (cantata; text by Ray Bridgman; music by Vollenhoven)

Personal life and legacy 
Hanna van Vollenhoven married artist and singer Allen Hamilton Vories Jr., in 1933. They lived in Weehawken, New Jersey, and sometimes performed together. They had a son, David, who was also a musician. She was a church organist in New Jersey. She died in 1972, in her eighties. New York University gives an annual Hanna van Vollenhollen Vories Memorial Prize in Music,  to a senior-year student majoring in music.

References

External links 
Hear Mon Reve by Hanna Vollenhoven
Free illustrated sheet music for "The Night Before Christmas" by Hanna Vollenhoven

American women composers
Dutch women classical composers
Dutch classical composers
1972 deaths
20th-century American women musicians
1889 births
Musicians from The Hague
Dutch pianists
People from Weehawken, New Jersey
20th-century women pianists
Dutch emigrants to the United States